Poor Man's Poison is an American folk band from Hanford, California. More recently, however, with their song "Feed The Machine" they've expanded into a more rock genre.

History 
The band was formed in 2009. They released three studio albums and one live album at the Fox Theatre in Hanford between 2009 and 2014, before temporarily splitting up. When the band got back together in 2019, they decided to focus on releasing singles instead of full albums due to their success on streaming platforms.

In September 2012, Poor Man's Poison won the "Best New Act in Country Music" at the Country Showdown in Nashville. They have also performed at Guantanamo Bay for US troops and opened for the Charlie Daniels Band.

Discography

Albums 

 Poor Man's Poison (2009)
 Friends with the Enemy (2011)
 Live at the Fox (2012)
 Providence (2014)

EPs
In the End (2021)

Singles 

 "Hell's Coming With Me" (2019)
 "Let Us All Down" (2020)
 "Feed the Machine" (2020)
 "Every Day is Exactly the Same" (2021)

References 

Musical groups from California
American folk musical groups
American bluegrass music groups